The 2017 North Carolina Tar Heels men's soccer team represented the University of North Carolina at Chapel Hill during the 2017 NCAA Division I men's soccer season. It was the 71st season of the university fielding a program.  The Tar Heels  played their home games at WakeMed Soccer Park in nearby Cary, North Carolina while Fetzer Field underwent renovations.

Roster

Updated August 10, 2017

Coaching Staff 

Source:

Schedule

Source:

|-
!colspan=8 style=""| Exhibition

|-
!colspan=7 style=""| Regular season

|-
!colspan=7 style=""| ACC Tournament

|-
!colspan=7 style=""| NCAA Tournament

Awards and honors

Rankings

MLS Draft 
The following members of the 2017 North Carolina Tar Heels men's soccer team were selected in the 2018 MLS SuperDraft.

See also 

 North Carolina Tar Heels men's soccer
 2017 Atlantic Coast Conference men's soccer season
 2017 NCAA Division I men's soccer season
 2017 ACC Men's Soccer Tournament
 2017 NCAA Division I Men's Soccer Championship

References

North Carolina
North Carolina Tar Heels men's soccer seasons
North Carolina men's soccer
North Carolina
North Carolina
NCAA Division I Men's Soccer Tournament College Cup seasons